Donald Duck Adventures is a 1987–1998 Disney comic book series featuring the adventures of Donald Duck and his nephews Huey, Dewey and Louie.

Publication history

Gladstone I: 1987–90 and Gladstone II: 1993–98 
Gladstone Publishing published 48 issues. The first 20 were published from 1987 to 1990 (#1-#20), and then the last 28 were published from 1993 to early 1998 (#21-#48), whereas Gladstone II continued the numbering of Gladstone I, ignoring the intermediate numbering of Disney Comics. The series contained original material alongside reprints from older Donald Duck strips from the 1930s and 1940s, as well as more modern material from the King syndicated strip from the 1980s.

Disney Comics: 1990–93 
Disney Comics published the title from 1990 to 1993, this one being the only one of the "new" Disney comic books to survive the company's comic implosion in 1991. They started a new numbering, issues #1-38.

Gemstone: 2003–06 
Gemstone Publishing published its own series of Donald Duck Adventures, this one as a digest size graphic novel alongside Mickey Mouse Adventures. These 128-page comics were sized 5" × 7½", and started a new numbering yet again, #1-#21. This Donald Duck Adventures was canceled in December 2006.

See also
 Disney comics 
 Disney comics titles in the USA:
 Mickey Mouse Magazine (1935-1940)
 Walt Disney's Comics and Stories (1940-present)
 Donald Duck (1942-2017)
 Mickey Mouse (1943-2017)
 Uncle Scrooge (1952-present)
 Walt Disney Comics Digest (1968-1976)
 Uncle Scrooge Adventures (1987-1997)
 Mickey Mouse Adventures (1990-1991)
 Donald Duck Adventures (1988-1998)
 Walt Disney Giant (1995-1996)

External links 
 Disney Comics Worldwide (DCW):
 Donald Duck Adventures (Gladstone I and II)
 Donald Duck Adventures (Disney Comics)
 Donald Duck Adventures (Gemstone)
 INDUCKS:
 Donald Duck Adventures (Gladstone I and II)
 Donald Duck Adventures (Disney Comics)
 Donald Duck Adventures (Gemstone)
 Covers of all issues on outducks.org:
 Donald Duck Adventures (Gladstone I and II)
 Donald Duck Adventures (Disney Comics)
 Donald Duck Adventures (Gemstone)

Donald Duck comics
Comics magazines published in the United States
Gladstone Publishing titles
Gemstone Publishing titles
Disney Comics titles
Disney comics titles
1987 comics debuts
1990 comics endings